A Herbalist Affair is a 2002 Hong Kong modern serial drama produced by TVB and starring Roger Kwok, Charmaine Sheh and Melissa Ng. It was released overseas in December 2001, aired on TVB Jade from 11 March to 5 April 2002, and was re-aired in April 2006.

Synopsis
A renowned Chinese medicine practitioner Cheung Si-Sung passed on his Chinese medicine shop to his son Wai-On after his wife died. Wai-On did not take good care of the shop and it lost its customers. Si-Sung’s grandson Yee-Fai works for a large Chinese medicine company. His enthusiasm attracts his colleague Sin-Yu, who does not want to work under her rich father. Yee-Fai is very careful with Sin-Yu as he thinks that she has been appointed to investigate him. Yee-Fai goes to Shanghai on business, and while there, he looks for an old friend of Si-Sung’s. Sin-Yu goes along with him as his secretary, and volunteers to help him fulfil his grandfather’s wish. Later, Yee-Fai meets Chinese medicine practitioner Geung Sum-Yu and Gook Yut-Siu. As Yee-Fai gets to know Yut-Siu better, they eventually work together in the medicine business.

Cast

The Cheung family

The Ng family

The Keung family

The Kuk family

Other cast

References

External links
Official website

TVB dramas
2002 Hong Kong television series debuts
2002 Hong Kong television series endings
2003 Hong Kong television series debuts
2003 Hong Kong television series endings
Serial drama television series
Hong Kong romance television series
2000s romance television series
2000s Hong Kong television series